Kafr Yahmul (also spelled, Kafrehmul)  is a Syrian village located in Maarrat Misrin Nahiyah in Idlib District, Idlib.  According to the Syria Central Bureau of Statistics (CBS), Kafr Yahmul had a population of 3179 in the 2004 census.

References 

Populated places in Idlib District